Ratrir Jatri is a 2019 Bangladeshi Bengali thriller drama film written and directed by Habibul Islam Habib and produced by Habibul Islam Habib and Faridur Reza Sagor. It is distributed by Jaaz Multimedia. Starring Anisur Rahman Milon, Mousumi, and A.T.M. Shamsuzzaman in the lead roles.

Cast 
 Moushumi as Moyna
 Anisur Rahman Milon as Ashik
 A.T.M. Shamsuzzaman as Chairman
 Marzuk Russell as Cousin
 Salauddin Lavlu
 Shahidul Alam Sachchu
 Aruna Biswas
 Naila Nayem

Songs 
 Sundori Nari - musician: soundtrack Ishtiaque Hasan
 Moyna

References

External links 
 

Bengali-language Bangladeshi films
2010s Bengali-language films